Doriemus (17 November 1990 – 11 January 2015) was a Thoroughbred racehorse who began his career in New Zealand and rose to prominence in Australia by winning the Caulfield and Melbourne Cups in 1995. He was the eighth of just nine horses to complete the double in the same year.

Breeding
He was bred to stay, being by Norman Pentaquad (USA) (by Riverman) out of Golden Woods by Zamazaan (FR). Doriemus was foaled in New Zealand and was a half-brother to the filly, Margaux by War Hawk II (GB).

Racing career
After two wins from three starts in New Zealand, Doriemus was transferred to Lee Freedman late in his three-year-old term, in the winter of 1994. The small, wiry chestnut won by four lengths on his Australian debut, but was considered immature and spelled.

He won only twice as a four-year-old, but did enough to qualify for the following year's Caulfield Cup. Carrying 52 kilograms, and ridden patiently by Damien Oliver, Doriemus overhauled South Australian and West Australian Derby winners, Count Chivas and Beaux Art over the closing stages.  Penalised 2.5 kilograms for the Melbourne Cup, to take his weight to 54.5 kilograms, Doriemus revelled in the rain-affected going to defeat Victoria Derby winner Nothin' Leica Dane and Irish Champion and 1993 Melbourne Cup winner Vintage Crop.  Freedman and Oliver had earlier combined to win Caulfield Cups with Mannerism and Paris Lane, and Doriemus was the third of Freedman's five Melbourne Cup winners, and the first of three for Oliver.

In 1996, Doriemus won the Queen Elizabeth Stakes, in the autumn, and the Turnbull Stakes, in the spring, but was fourth and sixth, respectively, in the Cups.  In 1997, he bled in Octagonal's Australian Cup, but returned to run second to Might and Power in both Cups.  Doriemus's jockey, Greg Hall, believed he had won the Melbourne Cup, and gave a wave of his whip after crossing the line, but the photo showed Might and Power had prevailed by the barest of margins.  In the autumn, Doriemus was again placed behind Might and Power in the Mercedes Classic, and was runner-up to Tie the Knot in the Sydney Cup.  In his final campaign, in the spring of 1998, he was second in the Metropolitan but finished 19th in the Melbourne Cup.

Doriemus was retired to Living Legends, the International Home of Rest for Champion Horses in Woodlands Historic Park, Greenvale, Victoria.

He was euthanised in January 2015 following a paddock accident aged 24.

Race record

Pedigree

See also
 Thoroughbred racing in Australia
 Thoroughbred racing in New Zealand
 List of millionaire racehorses in Australia
 List of Melbourne Cup winners

References

1990 racehorse births
2015 racehorse deaths
Racehorses bred in New Zealand
Racehorses trained in Australia
Melbourne Cup winners
Caulfield Cup winners
Thoroughbred family 2-b